"Geordy Black", also known as "Geordie Black" and "I'm Going Down the Hill" is a 19th-century Geordie folk song by Rowland "Rowley" Harrison, in a style deriving from music hall.

The song tells the tale of an old miner, reminiscing on his experiences. Harrison would routinely dress as Geordie Black when performing the song on stage.

Lyrics 
Chorus

Chorus

Variant versions
As this was a very popular song, it appeared in numerous editions. The many versions published show considerable variations in the spelling of the words, including:

Specific differences

Verse 3, line 1 - "" is replaced ""
Verse 3, line 1 - "" is replaced by ""
Verse 3, line 6 - "" changed to ""
Verse 3, line 7 - "" changed to ""

Publication
A small book of over 50 pages and sized about 5” x 7½” (125mm x 190mm) entitled Rowland Harrison’s Tyneside Songs containing local songs composed by Harrison (and with an illustrative sketch of "Geordy Black", was published around 1871. It includes "Geordie Black" and many other songs.

In modern times, the song also appears on the compact disc The Bonnie Gateshead Lass - Gateshead Songs by various artists on MWM Records (reference MWMCDSP43).

See also
 Geordie dialect words

References

External links
Farne folk archives

English folk songs
Fictional mining engineers
Songs about fictional male characters
Songs related to Newcastle upon Tyne
19th-century songs
Northumbrian folklore
Year of song unknown